Marta Verner (née Jandová; born 13 April 1974) is a Czech singer, best known for being the lead singer of the German alternative rock band Die Happy. She represented the Czech Republic in the Eurovision Song Contest 2015 along with Václav Noid Bárta with the song "Hope Never Dies".

Biography 
Marta Jandová is the daughter of the Czech musician Petr Janda, the solo-guitarist and singer of the band Olympic, which was one of the first and most popular rockbands in Czechoslovakia.

In September 1993, Jandová moved to Ulm, Germany. Soon after her arrival, despite speaking only a little bit of German, she was asked by guitarist Thorsten Mewes to sing in a new band. A few months later, they had their first gigs as Die Happy and she has been the leadsinger of the band ever since.

In 2005, Jandová performed with Finnish metal band Apocalyptica and represented Baden-Württemberg in the Bundesvision Song Contest 2005 with the song "Wie weit", placing 5th with 77 points. Jandová returned to the Bundesvision Song Contest in 2007 performing with Neue Deutsche Härte band Oomph! representing Lower Saxony with the song "Träumst du?", winning the contest with 147 points. The song reached the top ten in the German Media Control Charts.

Besides releasing 14 albums with Die Happy and her appearances in the Bundesvision Song Contest, she is also known for her cooperations with other German bands like Letzte Instanz, In Extremo, BAP etc. Together with Revolverheld, she released the single Halt dich an mir fest, which reached platinum status in Germany and was one of the most successful songs of 2010 in the German-speaking countries.

She moved back to her hometown Prague in 2008 where she sang in the musical Mona Lisa, but she still has a strong relationship to Germany, as she hosted the German TV show neoMusic in 2009 and was a judge at the ninth season of Popstars in Germany in 2010. Jandová also appeared as a judge on Czech/Slovak reality TV music competitions Česko Slovenská SuperStar (2009 and 2015) and Hlas Česko Slovenska (2014) .

Marta Jandová lives with Czech gynecologist Miroslav Verner and gave birth to their daughter Marie on 7 August 2013.

In 2015, for the return of the Czech Republic to the Eurovision Song Contest, Marta Jandová was asked to represent her home country in Vienna. Together with Václav Noid Bárta and the song "Hope Never Dies" they reached the 13th place of the second semi-final.

See also 
Czech Republic in the Eurovision Song Contest 2015

References

External links 

 

Living people
1974 births
Musicians from Prague
21st-century Czech women singers
Czech expatriates in Germany
Eurovision Song Contest entrants of 2015
Participants in the Bundesvision Song Contest
Eurovision Song Contest entrants for the Czech Republic
Czech heavy metal musicians
Women heavy metal singers